Andrey Rylach (born 5 June 2002) is a Belarusian professional footballer who plays for Dinamo Minsk.

References

External links 
 
 

2002 births
Living people
Belarusian footballers
Association football midfielders
FC Arsenal Dzerzhinsk players
FC Energetik-BGU Minsk players
FC Dinamo Minsk players